Leopold Biberti (1894–1969) was a Swiss actor. Born as French, he got the Swiss citizens rights in 1920.

Selected filmography
 Kleine Scheidegg (1937)
 Das Menschlein Matthias (1941)
 The Last Chance (1945)
 Swiss Tour (1949)
 Uli the Tenant (1955)
 Rose Bernd (1957)
 William Tell (1960)
 Sacred Waters (1960)

References

External links

1894 births
1960 deaths
French emigrants to Switzerland
French expatriates in Germany